Southwell is a settlement within the former farming district of the same name, about  from Port Alfred and about  from Grahamstown.

Established in 1849 as a mission station, it was located at Lombard's Post, a fortified farmhouse originally granted to Pieter Lombard in 1790 as a leningsplaas (loan farm). Canon Henry Waters was the first resident minister.

In the mid-19th century it hosted a Xhosa school, which was closed down during Mlanjeni's War.

The local St James Anglican Church was built in 1870. The foundation stone was laid by Nathaniel Merriman, Archdeacon of Grahamstown.

In 1925 a survey was done for a railway branch from Martindale to Southwell. The railway was never built.

References

External links 

1849 establishments in Africa
Populated places established in 1849
Populated places in the Ndlambe Local Municipality